Meineweh is a municipality in the Burgenlandkreis district, in Saxony-Anhalt, Germany. It was formed on 1 January 2010 as Anhalt Süd by the merger of the former municipalities Meineweh, Pretzsch and Unterkaka, and was renamed on 1 August 2011 to Meineweh.

References

Burgenlandkreis